Charles McCalgan (born 15 May 1954) is a South African cricketer. He played in one first-class and one List A match for Border in 1978/79.

See also
 List of Border representative cricketers

References

External links
 

1954 births
Living people
South African cricketers
Border cricketers
People from Springs, Gauteng